Santiago del Arrabal is a church in Toledo, Spain, built in 1245–48, at the orders of Sancho II, on the site of an earlier building, possibly a mosque. 
Many characteristics of Islamic architecture, such as the horseshoe arch, have remained in the present building which is built in the Mudéjar style. 

The church is dedicated to Saint James ("Santiago" in Spanish), "del Arrabal" refers to its location on the outskirts of Toledo (Arrabal being a Spanish word of Arabic origin). The patrons of the church during its foundation were members of the Diosdado family, knight commanders of the Order of Santiago.

External links
Museum with no Frontiers 
PAge at ArteHistoria
Tourist page in Castile-La Mancha

Toledo
Santiago, Toledo
Churches converted from mosques
Toledo
Santiago del Arrabal
Churches completed in 1248